"An Wasserflüssen Babylon" (By the rivers of Babylon) is a Lutheran hymn by Wolfgang Dachstein, which was first published in Strasbourg in 1525. The text of the hymn is a paraphrase of Psalm 137. Its singing tune, which is the best known part of the hymn and Dachstein's best known melody, was popularised as chorale tune of Paul Gerhardt's 17th-century Passion hymn "Ein Lämmlein geht und trägt die Schuld". With this hymn text, Dachstein's tune is included in the Protestant hymnal Evangelisches Gesangbuch.

Several vocal and organ settings of the hymn "An Wasserflüssen Babylon" have been composed in the 17th and 18th century, including short four-part harmonisations by Johann Hermann Schein, Heinrich Schütz and Johann Sebastian Bach. In the second half of the 17th century, Johann Pachelbel, Johann Adam Reincken and Bach's cousin, Johann Christoph, arranged settings for chorale preludes. Reincken's setting of "An Wasserflüssen Babylon" was elaborate and of great length; with one of Pachelbel's shorter settings as a chorale prelude, it forms the earliest extant transcriptions of Bach, copied on a 1700 organ tablature in Lüneburg when he was still a youth; remarkably, they were only unearthed in Weimar in 2005.

In 1720, at a celebrated organ concert in Hamburg, Bach extemporised a chorale setting of "An Wasserflüssen Babylon" in the presence of Reincken, two years before his death; earlier, during his second period in Weimar, Bach had already composed two organ settings of the chorale prelude. Finally, during his maturity in Leipzig, Bach reworked the chorale prelude as BWV 653, part of his Great Eighteen Chorale Preludes, written in 1739–1742.

History and context 

"An Wasserflüssen Babylon" is a Lutheran hymn written in 1525 and attributed to Wolfgang Dachstein, organist at St Thomas' Church, Strasbourg. The hymn is a closely paraphrased versification of Psalm 137, "By the rivers of Babylon", a lamentation for Jerusalem, exiled in Babylon. Its text and melody, Zahn No. 7663, first appeared in Strasbourg in 1525 in Wolf Köpphel's Das dritt theil Straßburger kirchenampt. This Strasbourg tract, which comprised the third part of the Lutheran service, is now lost. Despite the lost tract from 1525, the Strasbourg hymn appeared in print in 1526 in Psalmen, Gebett und Kirchenordnung wie sie zu Straßburg gehalten werden and later.

Wolfgang Egeloph Dachstein was born in 1487 in Offenburg in the Black Forest. In 1503 he became a fellow student with Martin Luther at the University of Erfurt. He entered the Dominican monastic order in around 1520 in Strasbourg, where he started a collaboration with Matthias Greiter, a friend and contemporary. Greiter was born in 1495 in Aichach, near Augsburg in Bavaria, where he attended a Latin school, before enrolling in theology at the University of Freiburg in 1510 and becoming a monk in Strasbourg in 1520.

During the Reformation, Protestantism was adopted in Strasbourg in 1524. The reforms involved the introduction of the German vernacular, the use of Lutheran liturgy ("Gottesdienstordnung") and congregational singing. Both Greiter and Dachstein renounced their monastic vows and married in Alsace. Their association continued, with Greiter becoming a cantor in the Cathedral and Dachstein an organist at St Thomas. Both played an important role in the musical life of Strasbourg, with many contributions to Lutheran hymns and psalms. Daniel Specklin, a 16th-century architect from Alsace, where the region Dachstein takes its name, described in detail how the pair engaged in "das evangelium" and "vil gute psalmen". A costly edition of the Straßburger Gesangbuch was published by Köpphel in 1541, with a preface by the Lutheran reformer Martin Bucer: the title, text and psalm were printed in characteristic red and black with woodcuts by Hans Baldung. During the Counter-Reformation, however, the Augsburg Interim resulted in Strasbourg reinstating Catholicism in October 1549: both Dachstein and Greiter renounced Protestantism and Bucer was sent into exile in England, where under Edward VI he became Regius Professor of Divinity.

Dachstein's hymn "An Wasserflüssen Babylon" was rapidly distributed—it was printed in Luther's 1545 Babstsches Gesangbuch—and spread to most Lutheran hymnbooks by central Germany. The hymn tune is Dachstein's best known composition. The melody of the hymn became better known than its text, through the association of that melody with Paul Gerhardt's 17th-century Passion hymn "Ein Lämmlein geht und trägt die Schuld". With that hymn text, the hymn tune of "An Wasserflüssen Babylon" was adopted as EG 83 in the Protestant hymnal Evangelisches Gesangbuch. After the Sack of Magdeburg in 1631, during the Thirty Years' War, it was decreed that Dachstein's 137th Psalm would be sung every year as part of the ceremonies to commemorate the destruction of Magdeburg—"O Magdeburg, du schoene Stadt verbrunnen verstoert."; and, amongst Ashkenazi culture, there was also a Hebrew version of Dachstein's composition in the same period.

Text 

The Lutheran text of Dachstein first appeared in 1525. Miles Coverdale provided an early English translation in the Tudor Protestant Hymnal "Ghostly Psalms and Spiritual Songs," 1539.  These Lutheran versifications were written in continental Europe while Coverdale was in exile from England.

Hymn tune 
Below is the 1525 hymn tune by Wolfgang Dachstein.

Musical settings

16th century 

Lupus Hellinck's four-part setting of "An Wasserflüssen Babylon" was published in 1544. The treatment is motet-like: the first part of the hymn tune is presented by the soprano voice, however adorned with inserted supplemental melodies, after which the tenor voice presents the rest of the hymn tune, with similar embellishments. A three-part setting by this composer had already been published in 1541. The 115 Guter newer Liedlein collection, published in 1544, contains an extended choral setting by : in this version, each stanza of the hymn is set for a different group of singers, from three to six voices. Wannenmacher's two-part setting (bicinium) of the hymn was published in 1553.

Sigmund Hemmel used the text in the 1550s in his four-part setting, with the cantus firmus in the tenor: Der gantz Psalter Davids, wie derselbig in teutsche Gesang verfasse was printed in 1569.

17th century

A native of Nuremberg, Hans Leo Hassler was taught by Andrea Gabrieli in Venice, where he excelled as a keyboard player and consorted with his younger uncle, Giovanni Gabrieli. Hassler's 4-part setting of "An Wasserflüssen Babylon" was composed in 1608.

Johann Hermann Schein composed a setting of "An Wasserflüssen Babylon" for two sopranos and instrumental accompaniment, which he published in 1617. His 1627 Cantional contained a four-part setting of the hymn, a setting which was republished by Vopelius's Neu Leipziger Gesangbuch (1682). In 1628 Heinrich Schütz published a four-part harmonisation of "An Wasserflüssen Babylon", SWV 242, in the Psalmen Davids, hiebevorn in teutzsche Reimen gebracht, durch D. Cornelium Beckern, und an jetzo mit ein hundert und drey eigenen Melodeyen ... gestellet, the Becker Psalter, Op. 5.
Samuel Scheidt, composed two settings of the hymn, SSWV 505 and 570, for soprano and organ in the Tabulatur-Buch hundert geistlicher Lieder und Psalmen of 1650.

Franz Tunder composed a setting of the hymn for soprano, strings and continuo. Organist at the Marienkirche, Lübeck from 1646 to 1668, Tunder initiated his Abendmusik there. Buxtehude later married Tunder's daughter and succeeded him as organist at Lübeck.

The hymn also inspired organ compositions in Northern Germany. Organ chorale preludes and free works by Johann Christoph Bach (Johann Sebastian's first cousin once removed), Johann Adam Reincken, Johann Pachelbel and Johann Sebastian Bach have been based on "An Wasserflüssen Babylon".

The 17th-century musical style of the stylus phantasticus covers the freely composed organ and harpsichord/clavichord works, including dance suites. They lie within two traditions: those from northern Germany, primarily for organ using the whole range of manual and pedal techniques, with passages of virtuoso exuberance; and those from central Germany, primarily for string keyboards, which have a more subdued style. Buxtehude and Reincken are important exponents of the northern school and Pachelbel those from the centre.

Johann Christoph Bach was born in Arnstadt in 1642 and was appointed organist at St George's, the principal church of Eisenach, from 1665. The 4-part chorale prelude "An Wasserflüssen Babylon" has the same kind of expressive dissonances, with suspensions, as his Lamento "Ach, daß ich Wassers gnug hätte" for voice and strings.

Born probably in 1643, Reincken was the natural successor to Scheidemann as organist at the St. Catherine's Church, Hamburg, with his musical interests extending beyond the church to the Hamburg Opera and the collegium musicum: as remarked by the 18th-century musician Johann Gottfried Walther, his famous, dazzling and audacious chorale fantasia "An Wasserflüssen Babylon" probably marked that succession; its vast dimension of 327 bars and 10 chorale lines, some broken into two, encompass a wide range of techniques, such as its "motet-like development, figuration of the chorale in the soprano, fore-imitation in diminished note values, introduction of counter-motifs, virtuoso passage work, double pedals, fragmentation, and echo effects."

The composer and organist Johann Pachelbel (1653–1707), born in Nuremberg in Bavaria, was most active in central Germany, particularly Thuringia. His vocal and instrumental music reflected the musical traditions across Germany. Having spent some of his early years as a musician in Vienna, he was appointed to the Predigerkirche, Erfurt in 1679–1690 As part of his duties as official organist at the Predigerkirche in Erfurt, 1678–1690, Pachelbel was required to give a concert each year to show his musical skills; the same contract also prescribed preludes for chorales. The chorales on "An Wasserflüssen Babylon" were all of that type: a concise four-part fugue followed by a 3-part setting accompanying a slow cantus firmus in the soprano or bass; or a 4-part setting with the soprano in the cantus firmus. The 2004 catalogue of Pachelbel's works, compiled posthumously by Jean M. Perreault, lists four chorale preludes based on the "An Wasserflüssen Babylon."
Another organ work by Pachelbel based on the hymn was discovered in 2006 in the same manuscript as Reincken's chorale fantasia. Its first recording, a performance by Jean-Claude Zehnder, was issued in 2007.

18th century
The young Johann Sebastian Bach was aware of Reincken's reputation and owned a copy of the chorale fantasia when he studied with Georg Böhm in 1700. Bach's copy, in organ tablature, was rediscovered in 2005 at the Herzogin Anna Amalia Bibliothek in Weimar by Michael Maul and Peter Wollny, and as such is believed to be one of Bach's oldest extant manuscripts.
 In a posthumous article,  wrote that, "Whether, however, Bach is the copyist of the source is not determined with certainty from the research conducted to date."

Reincken, whose celebrated chorale fantasia had already acquired a reputation, repaid the debt to Bach. In  there is a description of a concert in 1720, when Bach extemporised for "almost half an hour" on An Wasserflüssen Babylon at the organ loft of St. Catherine's Church, Hamburg. As recorded in his obituary, Bach "travelled to Hamburg, and allowed himself, in front of the Magistrat and many sophisticated people of the City, to be listened to for more than two hours on the beautiful organ at the Catherinenkirche with general amazement. The old organist at this church, Johann Adam Reincken, who then was almost a hundred years old, listened to him with special pleasure and particularly complimented him on the chorale "An Wasserflüssen Babylon" which our Bach treated and improvised for almost half an hour in a different way, very spaciously, as the brave ones among the Hamburg organists formerly used to play during the Saturday vespers. Reincken complimented him as follows: "I thought this kind of art had died out but I see that it is still alive in you"."

Bach composed his chorale prelude "An Wasserflüssen Babylon," BWV 653, as the third chorale of the Great Eighteen Chorale Preludes It was written in Leipzig, around 1739–1742, in his full maturity. There were also two earlier settings composed in Bach's second period at Weimar in the 1710s, one in five parts with a double-pedal. During his second period in Weimar, Bach had also envisaged expanding his collection of 46 chorale preludes in the miniaturist Orgelbüchlein. Empty manuscript pages were allocated for the projected 164 chorale preludes; as with "An Wasserflüssen Babylon," only the title appears.

In BWV 653 the same melancholic sarabande-like music of the chorale prelude can be heard in Bach's closing movements of the monumental Passions: the increasing chromaticism and passing dissonances create a mood of pathos. The mournful cantus firmus of BWV 653 is heard in the tenor voice en taille, accompanied by the two higher voices of the imitative ritornello with its steady crotchets and quavers in the pedals. The coda of BWV 653 shares some compositional features of Reincken's chorale prelude: the ornamental descending flourish at the end of Reincken's coda

can be compared with Bach's closing coda of BWV 653 with scales in contrary motion in the lower manual and pedal.

As Stinson writes, "It is hard not to believe that this correspondence represents an act of homage." Despite being composed in Leipzig within the traditions of Thuringia, however, Bach's contemplative "mesmerising" mood is far removed from his earlier improvisatory compositions in Hamburg and Reincken's chorale fantasia: the later chorale prelude is understated, with its cantus firmus subtly embellished.

There was also a four-part harmonisation of the chorale, BWV 267, published after Bach's death. It was part of a collection of 149 four-part chorales, made by the Thomasschule copyist Johann Ludwig Dietel in 1735 and unearthed only in 1981.  has given a detailed historical account of how the chorales were discovered, including background on the three Berlin musicians who first set about publishing them in the second half of the eighteenth century–Friedrich Wilhelm Marpurg, C. P. E. Bach and Johann Kirnberger. During that period, copies of the harmonisation have been found in G major and in A-flat major, both as "An Wasserflüssen Babylon" and as "Ein Lämmlein geht und trägt die Schuld": in the Breitkopf edition of the 1780s it appears as No. 5 in G major under the former title and as No. 308 in A-flat major under the latter title. In Schemelli's 1736 hymnal, to which Bach collaborated, the key of the "An Wasserflüssen Babylon" hymn, No. 587, is given as "D", and that of seven other hymns sung to the same melody, including "Ein Lämmlein geht und trägt die Schuld", No. 259, as "G".

19th century
The German composer of opera— Die lustigen Weiber von Windsor—and lieder, Otto Nicolai composed a 4-part setting of "An Wasserflüssen Babylon" in around 1832 as one of four songs in his op.17.

Notes

References 

 

 Vorwort (in German), Excerpt.

  Facsimiles: szMJMq_zmygC at Google Books; 1077430 Liturg. 1372 o at Bavarian State Library; Musicalisches Gesang-Buch (Schemelli, Georg Christian) at IMSLP website.

 
volume I
volume II
volume III

volume VI

Further reading

External links 

 
 
 
 
 
 Zu Fassungen der Melodie in Elsässischen Gesangbüchern colmarisches.free.fr
 Glebe, Karl; Heinermann, Otto: / Vorspiele zum deutsch-evangelischen Gesangbuch für Orgel dzb.de
 G. W. Fink: No. 24 Allgemeine musikalische Zeitung, volume 38, 1836
 
 

16th-century hymns in German
Lutheran hymns based on Psalms